Irving Falú (born June 6, 1983) is a Puerto Rican professional baseball infielder. He played in Major League Baseball (MLB) for the Kansas City Royals, Milwaukee Brewers, and San Diego Padres from 2012 to 2014.

Career

Kansas City Royals
After playing college baseball at Indian Hills Community College in Iowa, the Kansas City Royals selected Falú in the 21st round of the 2003 MLB draft. He was called up to the major league level for the first time on May 3, 2012. He made his debut on May 6 against the New York Yankees at shortstop, and hit a triple in his first major league at-bat, as well as a base hit with his second at bat. He was released by the Royals on November 25, 2013.

Milwaukee Brewers
Falú signed a minor league deal with the Milwaukee Brewers on December 4, 2013.

San Diego Padres
Falu was claimed off waivers by the San Diego Padres on June 26, 2014.

Return to Milwaukee
On July 17, Falu was claimed by the Milwaukee Brewers.

Cincinnati Reds

On December 3, Falu signed a minor league contract with the Reds, and was assigned to AA Pensacola. He elected free agency on November 6, 2015.

Guerreros de Oaxaca
On March 4, 2016, Falu signed with the Guerreros de Oaxaca of the Mexican Baseball League.

Kansas City Royals
On June 5, 2016, Falu signed a minor league deal with the Kansas City Royals.

Washington Nationals
On January 12, 2017, Falu signed a minor league contract with the Washington Nationals. He resigned a minor league deal on October 31, 2017. He elected free agency on November 2, 2018.

Personal life
Falú is the cousin of former Royals player and Boston Red Sox first base coach Luis Alicea.

His brother, Melvin Falú, was selected by the St. Louis Cardinals in the 28th round of the 2002 MLB June Amateur Draft from Southern Arkansas University in Magnolia, Arkansas.

See also
 List of Major League Baseball players from Puerto Rico

References

External links

1983 births
Living people
Arizona League Royals players
Atenienses de Manatí (baseball) players
Burlington Bees players
Cangrejeros de Santurce (baseball) players
Gigantes de Carolina players
Guerreros de Oaxaca players
High Desert Mavericks players
Indios de Mayagüez players
Indian Hills Falcons baseball players
Kansas City Royals players
Liga de Béisbol Profesional Roberto Clemente infielders
Louisville Bats players
Major League Baseball players from Puerto Rico
Major League Baseball second basemen
Mexican League baseball second basemen
Mexican League baseball shortstops
Milwaukee Brewers players
Nashville Sounds players
Northwest Arkansas Naturals players
Omaha Royals players
Omaha Storm Chasers players
People from Carolina, Puerto Rico
Puerto Rican expatriate baseball players in Mexico
San Diego Padres players
Syracuse Chiefs players
Wichita Wranglers players
Yaquis de Obregón players
2013 World Baseball Classic players